The Williams Lake TimberWolves are a Junior "A" ice hockey team from Williams Lake, British Columbia, Canada currently suspended from the BCHL. They were part of the British Columbia Hockey League. The team took a leave of absence for the 2007-08 and 2008-2009 seasons to relocate to Wenatchee, Washington. Due to a disagreement between Hockey Canada and USA Hockey, the relocation failed and the TimberWolves returned to play in Williams Lake in September 2009, with a new logo and new owners. The T-Wolves have not participated since the 2009-10 BCHL season after being suspended by the league for being a franchise "not in good standing", after accumulating heavy debt to local businesses and the league.

Season-by-season record
Note: GP = Games Played, W = Wins, L = Losses, T = Ties, OTL = Overtime Losses, GF = Goals for, GA = Goals against

See also
List of ice hockey teams in British Columbia

References

External links
Williams Lake TimberWolves

Defunct British Columbia Hockey League teams
2002 establishments in British Columbia
Ice hockey clubs established in 2002
2010 disestablishments in British Columbia
Ice hockey clubs established in 2010